Božidar Bandović (born 30 August 1969) is a Montenegrin professional football manager for V.League 1 club Hanoi FC and former player who played as a defender.

Playing career

Born in Nikšić, SR Montenegro, as a player, while playing for the 1991 European and World Champions Red Star Belgrade, he won one national Championship in 1994-95 and two national cups in 1993 and 1995.

He is the younger brother of another ex-Red Star footballer, Nebojša Bandović.

Coaching career 
Start as assistant coach to the Greek coach Babis Tennes at FC Kerkyra (6/2005 – 6/2006) and FC Akratitos (6/2004 – 6/2005) Greek Second Division. Both years with different teams went from the Second to The First division.

In Olympiacos from June 2006 till October 2010, he worked as head of analysis, scouter Olympiacos (July 2006 – January 2010) scouting opponent with team having successes playing Champion League and dominated in Greek Championship. Two times as assistant coach, Olympiacos (January 2008 - June 2008) to the head coach José Segura from Spain (team won championship, Greek Cup) and June 2010 – October 2010 assistant manager to Ewald Lienen from Germany.

Bandović took the technical leadership of the Olympiacos two times (first September 2009 taken control of the team temporarily before Zico's arrival and second at January 2010 with Andreas Niniadis as his assistant after Zico's dismissal.  as a caretaker coach after Temuri Ketsbaia's dismissal. 
Initially appointed as a head coach in September 2009 during the Champion League and had a successful start including three very credible games with Alkmaar and Championship away games with AEK and Paok. Second time in January 2010, having taken over halfway through the season with the club playing in Champion League against Bordeaux.

In November 2010 was hired by Kerkyra F.C. replacing Babis Tennes. In Kerkyra F.C. successful stay in The First Division that proved to be the first time in the history in Super League concerning they dropped down three times in the pas. In November 2011 he left the club.

On 17 January 2012 he was officially announced as the team manager of AEL 1964 FC, replacing Chris Coleman, but did not sign a contract.

As head coach called to Azerbaijan to manage FC Baku in June 2012. Took over the team 10 days before the Championship started.
Under Bozidar's guidance, the team played in the first six play-offs and in semifinal of Azerbaijan Cup. First time in history team didn't lose 10 games in a row.

Manage Buriram United in Thailand from January 4, 2014, Start with great win in Champion League against Sangdong, Pohang drew 4 points from 2 games. In championship stayed unbeaten for 12 games, with team going from 13th table position to 3rd. Surprising suddenly terminated contract from the club at 7/2014.

In 2016, as a Head Coach of Sisaket he made club record managing to stay undefeated at home ground for entire 7 months.

From June 2017, in position of Head Coach for Buriram United he won Thai Premier League and made league record finishing season with 86 points, most points ever made in Thai Premier League. Also under his guidance club get rewards for "Best developing club", "Best player of the year", "Best foreign player of the year", "Men's player of the year" and "Best youth player of the year".

In season 2018. he led his team Buriram United to another Champions title of Thai Premier League and their dominance is best shown by their making of two new records by winning 87 points in one season, and record of 15 consecutive wins.

He was named Thai Premier League Coach of The Year 2018.

This season they also made great success when they qualified to "Round of 16" of AFC Champions League, after advancing from a very difficult group stage clashes with Guangzhou Evergrande, Cerezo Osaka and Jeju United. Buriram United was eliminated by South Korean champions Jeonbuk Hyundai Motors FC after total score 4–3 in two match clash. After Buriram win at home 3–2, they lost in Jeonju match 2–0, but they finished their presentation in Asia's top club competition with proud. Buriram United was named officially 12th ranked club of this competition for season 2018.

Season 2019 they started with another trophy, they won Thailand Champions Cup with a dominant win 3–1 over last year FA Cup champion, Chiangrai United.

On 10 July 2021, Bandović was appointed as the head coach of Indian Super League club Chennaiyin on a one-year deal. Under his guidance, the club began their 2021–22 Indian Super League season campaign on 23 November with a 1–0 win over Hyderabad.

Managerial statistics

Achievements

With Akratitos F.C. - Assistant Coach
 Promotion to Superleague Greece

With PAE Kerkyra - Assistant Coach
 Promotion to Superleague Greece

With Olympiacos - Assistant Coach
 Superleague Greece - Winner
 Greek Cup - Winner
 Greek Super Cup - Winner

With Olympiacos - Head Coach - Temporary
 UEFA Champions League Last 16

With PAE Kerkyra - Head Coach
 Superleague Greece - Saves club from relegation for the first time in club history

With Baku - Head Coach
 Azerbaijan Premier League - Qualified for playoff

With BEC Tero Sasana - Head Coach
 2015 Toyota Premier Cup - Winner

With Buriram United - Technical Director
Mekong Club Championship 2017

With Buriram United - Head Coach
Thai Premier League 2017 - Winner and record with 86 points, most points ever made in Thai Premier League history.
Thai Premier League 2018 - Winner and record with 87 points, most points ever made in Thai Premier League history.
Thai Premier League 2018 - Record of 15 consecutive league match wins in Thai Premier League
Thai Premier League 2018 - Coach of The Year
AFC Champions League 2018 - Knock-out stage, Round of 16
Thailand Champions Cup 2019 - Winners

With Hanoi - Head Coach
Vietnamese Super Cup 2023 - Winner against Haiphong.

References

1969 births
Living people
Footballers from Nikšić
Association football defenders
Yugoslav footballers
Serbia and Montenegro footballers
St. Louis Steamers (original MISL) players
FK Sutjeska Nikšić players
Red Star Belgrade footballers
Ethnikos Piraeus F.C. players
Paniliakos F.C. players
Olympiacos F.C. players
PAOK FC players
Ethnikos Asteras F.C. players
Major Indoor Soccer League (1978–1992) players
Yugoslav Second League players
Yugoslav First League players
First League of Serbia and Montenegro players
Super League Greece players
Yugoslav expatriate footballers
Expatriate soccer players in the United States
Yugoslav expatriate sportspeople in the United States
Serbia and Montenegro expatriate footballers
Expatriate footballers in Greece
Serbia and Montenegro expatriate sportspeople in Greece
Montenegrin football managers
Olympiacos F.C. managers
A.O. Kerkyra managers
Athlitiki Enosi Larissa F.C. managers
FC Baku managers
Bozidar Bandovic
Bozidar Bandovic
Bozidar Bandovic
Super League Greece managers
Montenegrin expatriate football managers
Expatriate football managers in Greece
Montenegrin expatriate sportspeople in Greece
Expatriate football managers in Azerbaijan
Montenegrin expatriate sportspeople in Azerbaijan
Expatriate football managers in Thailand
Montenegrin expatriate sportspeople in Thailand
Montenegrin expatriate sportspeople in India
Expatriate football managers in India
Chennaiyin FC managers